A ropewalk is a long straight narrow lane, or a covered pathway, where long strands of material are laid before being twisted into rope.

Ropewalk may also refer to:

Arts and entertainment
 Ropewalk (album), by The View, 2015
 Ropewalk (film), a 2000 American romantic comedy film

Places
 Ropewalk (Karlskrona), a building on the island of Lindholmen, Sweden
 Ropewalk, Barton-upon-Humber, a regional centre for the arts in North Lincolnshire, England
 RopeWalks, Liverpool, a vicinity of Liverpool city centre, England
 Ropewalk Pumping Station, on the Ropewalk in Nottingham, England
 Ropewalk Shopping Centre, in Nuneaton, Warwickshire, England

See also

Rope
Tightrope walking